Bracelet Bay is a small bay on the south of the Gower Peninsula. It is the first bay one comes to after leaving Swansea Bay and rounding Mumbles Head.

Surrounded by limestone cliffs, the bay is pebbly, with some sand. To the west, the bay is separated from Limeslade Bay by Tutt Hill, the location of a coastguard look-out station.

A notable feature of the bay is the "Big Apple" kiosk, a concrete structure that was erected by the roadside during the 1930s as an advertising feature and has been a sales outlet ever since. Several similar kiosks were erected along the South Wales coast, but the one in Bracelet Bay is the only example surviving. In 2010 it was largely rebuilt after being damaged by a vehicle the previous year, and in 2019 it was designated a Grade II listed building.

The name 'Bracelet' is thought to be a corruption of 'Broad Slade'.

References

External links
 GowerUK.com - Bracelet Bay
 Gower Tourism website page with pictures of the bay
 The Gower Information Centre Website's entry on Bracelet Bay
 Bracelet Bay handmade accessories that donate proceeds from sales to charities

Bays of the Gower Peninsula
Sites of Special Scientific Interest in West Glamorgan
Mumbles